WISHES stands for Web-based Information Service for Higher Education Students (WISHES). As a European Project run by nine European institutions WISHES centrally promotes European work and study offers for students worldwide by means of a user-driven web-based information portal.
Based on the expressed needs of over 4.000 students, this WISHES web-portal centralizes information and creates profiles of European higher education institutions (HEIs) and employment bodies, tailored to Bologna and Lisbon parameters.

Backed up with a powerful and diverse supporting network consisting of more than 100 HEIs, European associations and networks, as well as with the support of various national agencies, Rector's Conferences and the European Commission, WISHES offers its services to three main target groups: Students worldwide, higher education institutions and enterprises.

WISHES target groups
WISHES offers its benefits to three main target groups:

Students – students of universities and colleges worldwide interested in studying or working abroad. Additionally, WISHES also targets pupils searching for higher abroad. Close cooperation with student associations are currently set up (such as with the Erasmus Student Network or the European Medical Students Association).

Higher education institutions – Universities, Colleges, Academic Associations, Educational Networks, European Network, and other higher education institutions based in the Bologna signatory countries are eligible to present themselves and their offers in WISHES. Concretely WISHES targets persons responsible for international affairs such as vice rectors for international relations and international officers.

Enterprisers – employment bodies, members of professional associations, and companies based in the Bologna signatory states looking for ways to reach international students and recent graduates worldwide.

Basic elements
Meeting the needs of today's international students, the WISHES Mobility Portal consists of three components:

 Information Portal: The information portal presents European study offers. Here in addition to relevant information about the various courses of study available, information about country, city, housing, cost of living, and similar will be presented.
 Work placement database: The second component of the platform, the international work placement database, presents employment bodies and their offers by means of individual web-based business cards to students worldwide.
 Online Community: In the "online community", the third component of the WISHES Mobility Portal, students comment, discuss and evaluate the various studies and work offers and practical issues of how to organize a stay abroad. This virtual marketplace is structured according to the various countries respectively university towns in Europe and thus enables a virtual matching of former and future international students – between and within the various students' generations.

WISHES consortium
The WISHES consortium consists of 9 institutions:

 University of Paderborn (DE)
 Haute École de la Province de Liège (BE)
 CATT Innovation-Management GmbH (AT)
 European Office of Cyprus (CY)
 Ondokuz Mayıs University (TR)
 Hogeschool-Universiteit Brussel (HUB) (BE)
 University of Granada (ES)
 Tomas Bata University in Zlín (CZ)
 Saint Petersburg State University of Service and Economics (RUS)

History
In December 2006 during their Erasmus Semester at Tomas Bata University in Zlín, Czech Republic Michael Steinmann and Ricardo Dores came up with the idea of creating one web portal centrally presenting all relevant information about living and learning in the Erasmus Universities throughout Europe.

Due to their huge commitment and achieved early support by various universities, their idea grew rapidly : Presentations on diverse international conferences were followed by an invitation from Alan Smith to present the idea behind WISHES in the Directorate General of Education and Culture (DG EAC) of the European Commission in Brussels in April 2007.

Supported by the University of Paderborn, Michael Steinmann and Prof. Dr. Leena Suhl submitted in 2008 a project proposal within the Action 4 of the Erasmus Mundus Programme to enhance the attractiveness of higher in Europe. Subsequently, in October 2008, WISHES has been approved by the European Commission (Agreement No. 2008-2457 / 001 – 001 MUN MUNATT), and was kicked of in December 2008.

In 2009 three major WISHES surveys have been carried out to lay solid grounds for the future WISHES mobility portal: Within these surveys 600 higher education institutions, 100 enterprises and 4 000 students stated their wishes concerning a central source of information concerning European study and work options. Additionally, to further promote the project's idea, WISHES has in 2009 been presented within various major European conferences on higher education mobility: The ERACON Conference 2009 (29 April – 3 May 2009, Nicosia, Cyprus) and the EAIE Conference 2009 (16 – 19 September, Madrid, Spain).

In May 2010 the WISHES mobility portal was launched for  higher education institutions during the WISHES Networking days (NWD 2010) in Essen, Germany. Since June 2010 European higher education institutions have been enabled to prepare their presentations in WISHES for the launch of WISHES for students worldwide in September 2010.

Next steps
In September 2010 WISHES will be launched for students worldwide. Starting from February 2011 employment bodies will be able to promote their offers by means of WISHES.

Furthermore, Erasmus Mundus WISHES Project will be presented on the following conferences:

2010

 July:          ERACON Conference, Vienna, Austria
 September:     EAIE Conference, Nantes, France
 November:     QS APPLE, Singapore

2011
 March:         APAIE Conference, Taipei, Taiwan (R.O.C.)
 April:         ERACON Conference, Athens, Greece
 Juni:          NAFSA, Vancouver, British Columbia, Canada
 September:    EAIE Conference, Copenhagen, Denmark
 October:       WISHES Networking days 2011, Saint Petersburg, Russia

See also 
 Academic mobility

References

External links
 Official website of the project
hamariwishes

Educational policies and initiatives of the European Union
Academic transfer
Erasmus Mundus Programmes
Information technology organizations based in Europe
https://hamariwishes.com/https://hamariwishes.com/